Wang Qiao (born 13 August 1957) is a Chinese environmentalist currently serving as director of the Ministry of Ecology and Environment Center for Satellite Application on Ecology and Environment.

Biography
Wang was born in Chongqing on August 13, 1957. In 1982 he graduated from Nankai University, majoring in mathematics. He received his master's degree in cartography and doctor's degree in cartography and geographical information system from Wuhan University in 1992 and 1996, respectively. In June 2009 he was appointed deputy director of the Ministry of Ecology and Environment Center for Satellite Application on Ecology and Environment, five years later he was promoted to the director position.

Honours and awards
 July 2018 Fellow of the International Academy of Astronautics (IAA)
 November 22, 2019 Member of the Chinese Academy of Engineering (CAE)

References

1957 births
Living people
Engineers from Chongqing
Chinese environmentalists
Nankai University alumni
Wuhan University alumni
Members of the Chinese Academy of Engineering